Mosqueira is a rare variant of the more popular Mosquera. Notable people with the surname include:
Gabriela Mosqueira (born 1990), Paraguayan rower
Ismael Mosqueira (1911–1966), Mexican gymnast
Josh Mosqueira, Canadian-Mexican game designer
Rolando Mosqueira (born 1920), Chilean equestrian
Silvano Mosqueira (1875–1954), Paraguayan writer

Spanish-language surnames